Muhammad ibn al-Ash'ath al-Khuza'i was an early Abbasid follower and later became Abbasid governor in Iran, Egypt and Ifriqiya for the Abbasid Caliphate.

Life 
Muhammad was a deputy naqib during the Abbasid missionary phase in Khurasan and the Abbasid Revolution that followed. Upon the spread of the Revolution, Abu Muslim appointed Muhammad as governor of Tabasayn, Fars and Kerman. In 755 he participated in the suppression of the rebellion of Sunpadh at Rayy, and in the next year fought against another rebel, Jawhar ibn Marar, also at Rayy (although the two events may have been mixed up in the sources, so that Muhammad may in reality have been present only at one).

In 758/9, he was named governor of Egypt, a post he held until 760/1, and was then sent west against the Ibadites of Ifriqiya. According to the Mamluk historian Safadi, he was also governor of Damascus under al-Mansur. Muhammad died in 766, while on his way to take part in a summer raid against the Byzantine Empire.

His sons also had distinguished careers: Ja'far was sahib al-shurta for Harun al-Rashid and governor of Khurasan, while Nasr was governor of Palestine and of Sindh.

References

Sources 
 

766 deaths
8th-century Arabs
8th-century Abbasid governors of Egypt
Generals of the Abbasid Caliphate
Abbasid governors of Egypt
Abbasid governors of Ifriqiya
Abbasid governors of Fars
Year of birth missing
8th-century people from the Abbasid Caliphate
8th-century people of Ifriqiya